John Chambers is an American television soap opera writer. Beside writing for soaps, John also wrote an episode of JAG, Strange World, Law & Order: Special Victims Unit, Brooklyn South and NYPD Blue.

Positions held
The Bold and the Beautiful
 Script Writer (2005 - May 18, 2007)

External links

American soap opera writers
American male television writers
Year of birth missing (living people)
Living people
Place of birth missing (living people)